Xueshi Subdistrict is a subdistrict of Yuelu District in Changsha, Hunan, China. It is historically the territory of Xueshi Township, Wangcheng County in 1994. The subdistrict has three villages and six communities under its jurisdiction.

History
In 589 AD, Linxiang County was renamed to Changsha County, today's Xueshi Subdistrict was part of Changsha County. From the year 1098 AD, Shanhua County was established from Changsha County, by 1912, Shanhua was incorporated into Changsha County, it belonged to Shanhua County.

In May 1951, Wangcheng County was established from part of Changsha County and Xueshi Township belonged to the 4th District of Wangcheng County. As the Revocation of Districts and Amalgamation of Townships in June 1956, the former Pingguan District was divided into four townships as Xueshi Township. As the Revocation of Townships and Establishment of Communes in October 1958, Xueshi Township was merged into the Pingtang People's Commune, Wangcheng County was formally merged to Changsha County in March 1959 and Pingtang was a district of Changsha County. As administrative divisions of a county, county controlled districts were reorganized in July 1961 and the Pingtang District of Changsha County was established, meanwhile the size of the communes was reduced and Xueshi Commune was formed from Pingtang Commune. In December 1962, Lianhua District was created from part of Pingtang District, the Xueshi Commune still belonged to Pingtang District. In January 1978, Wangcheng County was rebuilt and Xueshi was in the territory of Wangcheng County. In March 1984, the commune of Xueshi  was reorganized to a township, the township of Xueshi governed 10 villages of Baihe, Banma, Changfeng, Chijiang, Dongshan, Juntang, Tangxia, Xueshi, Yuhua and Zhatang.

As the Revocation of Districts and Amalgamation of Townships in June 1995, the township of Xueshi was merged into Jiujiang Township, the township of Jiujiang had 23 villages with a total area of 91.8 square kilometers, its seat was in Liqiao Village. In February 1998, the township of Jiujiang was reorganized into the town of Hanpu. As the Amalgamation of Village-level Divisions of Wangcheng County in 2004, the divisions of Hanpu was reduced to 12 (2 communities and 10 villages) from 24 (a community and 23 villages). On June 15, 2008, the town of Hanpu was transferred from Wangcheng County to Yuelu District. On August 3, 2012, the town of Hanpu was officially reorganized to a subdistrict.

On January 18, 2013, the former Hanpu Subdistrict was converted to the two subdistricts of Hanpu and Xueshi. The subdistrict of Xueshi had a community (Baihe Community), and four villages of Lianfeng, Xueshi, Yujiang and Dongshanwan with an area of 42.28 square kilometers.

Subdivisions
By 2017, the subdistrict of Xueshi has three villages and six communities under its jurisdiction.

3 villages
 Lianfeng Village
 Xuehua Village
 Xuetai Village

6 communities
 Baihe Community
 Banmatang Community
 Xue'an Community
 Xuelian Community
 Xuejin Community
 Xueshiqiao Community

References

External links
 Official Website （Chinese / 中文）

Yuelu District
Subdistricts of Changsha